Bhawanipur  is a village in Kapurthala district of Punjab State, India. The village is administrated by a Sarpanch who is an elected representative.

Demography
According to the 2011 Census of India, Bhawanipur had 487 houses and a population of 2,472, comprising 1,317 males and 1,155 females. The Literacy rate was 75.52%, lower than state average of 75.84%.  The population of children under the age of 6 years was 266 and the child sex ratio was approximately 750, lower than state average of 846.

Air travel connectivity 
The closest airport to the village is Sri Guru Ram Dass Jee International Airport.

Villages in Kapurthala

References

External links
  Villages in Kapurthala
 Kapurthala Villages List

Villages in Kapurthala district